The 1971 Pittsburgh Steelers season was the team's 39th in the National Football League. The Steelers showed improvement finishing in second Place with a 6-8 record. But Terry Bradshaw struggled with turnovers in his second season throwing 22 interceptions to 13 touchdown passes. The Steelers that year drafted wide receiver Frank Lewis, Hall of Fame linebacker Jack Ham, guard Gerry Mullins, defensive end Dwight White, tight end/tackle Larry Brown, defensive tackle Ernie Holmes, and safety Mike Wagner, all key contributors during the Steelers Super Bowl teams of the 1970s.

Offseason

NFL Draft

Personnel

Staff

Roster

Regular season

Schedule

Game summaries

Week 1 at Bears

Week 2 (Sunday September 26, 1971): Cincinnati Bengals  

at Three Rivers Stadium, Pittsburgh, Pennsylvania

 Game time: 
 Game weather: 
 Game attendance: 48,448
 Referee: Norm Schachter
 TV announcers:

Scoring drives:

 Cincinnati – FG Muhlmann 33 – Bengals 3–0
 Pittsburgh – Smity 16 pass from Bradshaw (Gerela kick) – Steelers 7–3
 Cincinnati – Parrish 14 fumble return (Muhlmann kick) – Bengals 10–7
 Pittsburgh – Staggers 67 punt return (Gerela kick) – Steelers 14–10
 Pittsburgh – Pearson 13 pass from Bradshaw (Gerela kick) – Steelers 21–10

Week 3 (Sunday October 3, 1971): San Diego Chargers  

at Three Rivers Stadium, Pittsburgh, Pennsylvania

 Game time: 
 Game weather: 
 Game attendance: 44,339
 Referee: Jim Tunney
 TV announcers:

Scoring drives:

 San Diego – FG Partee 21 – Chargers 3–0
 Pittsburgh – Fuqua 5 run (Gerela kick) – Steelers 7–3
 San Diego – Parks 16 pass from Hadl (Partee kick) – Chargers 10–7
 Pittsburgh – Fuqua 1 run (Gerela kick) – Steelers 14–10
 San Diego – Garrett 4 run (Partee kick) – Chargers 17–14
 Pittsburgh – Bradshaw 5 run (Gerela kick) – Steelers 21–17
Steelers stop San Diego with a goal line stand preserving the 21-17 win.

Week 4 (Sunday October 10, 1971): Cleveland Browns  

at Cleveland Municipal Stadium, Cleveland, Ohio

 Game time: 
 Game weather: 
 Game attendance: 83,391
 Referee: Jack Vest
 TV announcers:

Scoring drives:

 Cleveland – FG Cockroft 25 – Browns 3–0
 Cleveland – Morin 19 pass from Nelsen (Cockroft kick) – Browns 10–0
 Cleveland – Scott 18 run (Cockroft kick) – Browns 17–0
 Pittsburgh – D. Smith 22 pass from Bradshaw (Gerela kick) – Browns 17–7
 Cleveland – FG Cockroft 20 – Browns 20–7
 Pittsburgh – FG Gerela 33 – Browns 20–10
 Pittsburgh – Shanklin 11 pass from Bradshaw (Gerela kick) – Browns 20–17
 Cleveland – Kelly 7 run (Cockroft kick) – Browns 27–17

Week 5 (Monday October 18, 1971): Kansas City Chiefs  

at the Municipal Stadium, Kansas City, Missouri

 Game time: 
 Game weather: 
 Game attendance: 49,533
 Referee: Pat Haggerty
 TV announcers:ABC Howard Cosell, Frank Gifford, Don Meredith

Scoring drives:

 Pittsburgh – FG Gerela 32 – Steelers 3–0
 Pittsburgh – FG Gerela 40 – Steelers 6–0
 Pittsburgh – FG Gerela 35 – Steelers 9–0
 Kansas City – Taylor 5 pass from Dawson (Stenerud kick) – Steelers 9–7
 Kansas City – Taylor 27 pass from Dawson (Stenerud kick) – Chiefs 14–9
 Kansas City – Wright 5 pass from Dawson (Stenerud kick) – Chiefs 21–9
 Kansas City – Podolak 1 run (Stenerud kick) – Chiefs 28–9
 Kansas City – FG Stenerud 11 – Chiefs 31–9
 Pittsburgh – Fuqua 1 run (Gerela kick) – Chiefs 31–16
 Kansas City – Thomas 32 interception return (Stenerud kick) – Chiefs 38–16

Week 6 (Sunday October 24, 1971): Houston Oilers  

at Three Rivers Stadium, Pittsburgh, Pennsylvania

 Game time: 
 Game weather: 
 Game attendance: 45,872
 Referee: Ben Dreith
 TV announcers:

Scoring drives:

 Houston – Dawkins 1 run (Moseley kick) – Oilers 7–0
 Pittsburgh – FG Gerela 28 – Oilers 7-3
 Houston – FG Moseley 24 – Oilers 10-3
 Pittsburgh – FG Gerela 22 – Oilers 10-6
 Houston – Dawkins 1 run (kick failed) – Oilers 16-6
 Pittsburgh – FG Gerela – Oilers 16-9
 Pittsburgh – Bradshaw 1 run (Gerela kick) – Tie 16–16
 Pittsburgh – Fuqua 30 run (Gerela kick) – Steelers 23–16

Week 7 (Sunday October 31, 1971): Baltimore Colts  

at Memorial Stadium, Baltimore, Maryland

 Game time: 
 Game weather: 60,238
 Game attendance: 
 Referee: Jack Reader
 TV announcers:

Scoring drives:

 Baltimore – Bulaich 1 run (O'Brien kick) – Colts 7–0
 Baltimore – FG O'Brien 20 – Colts 10–0
 Baltimore – FG O'Brien 9 – Colts 13–0
 Pittsburgh – Bradshaw 3 run (Gerela kick) – Colts 13–7
 Baltimore – Richardson 19 pass from Morrall (O'Brien kick) – Colts 20–7
 Baltimore – Richardson 49 pass from Morrall (O'Brien kick) – Colts 27–7
 Baltimore – Perkins 60 pass from Morrall (O'Brien kick) – Colts 34–7
 Pittsburgh – Shanklin 31 pass from Bradshaw (Gerela kick) – Colts 34–14
 Pittsburgh – Bradshaw 1 run (Gerela kick) – Colts 34–21

Week 8 (Sunday November 7, 1971): Cleveland Browns  

at Three Rivers Stadium, Pittsburgh, Pennsylvania

 Game time: 
 Game weather: 
 Game attendance: 50,202
 Referee: Fred Wyant
 TV announcers:

Scoring drives:

 Pittsburgh – FG Gerela 45 – Steelers 3–0
 Pittsburgh – Bradshaw 1 run (Gerela kick) – Steelers 10–0
 Pittsburgh – FG Gerela 23 – Steelers 13–0
 Pittsburgh – FG Gerela 17 – Steelers 16–0  
 Cleveland – Safety, Houston tackled Walden in end zone – Steelers 16–2
 Cleveland – Scott 1 run (Cockroft kick) – Steelers 16–9
 Pittsburgh – FG Gerela 13 – Steelers 19–9
 Pittsburgh – Smith 40 pass from Hanratty (Gerela kick) – Steelers 26–9

Week 9 (Sunday November 14, 1971): Miami Dolphins  

at Miami Orange Bowl, Miami, Florida

 Game time: 
 Game weather: 
 Game attendance: 66,435
 Referee: Bob Frederic
 TV announcers:

Scoring drives:

 Miami – FG Yepremian 43 – Dolphins 3–0
 Pittsburgh – Smith 30 pass from Bradshaw (Gerela kick) – Steelers 7–3
 Pittsburgh – Shanklin 28 pass from Bradshaw (Gerela kick) – Steelers 14–3
 Pittsburgh – Smith 16 pass from Bradshaw (Gerela kick) – Steelers 21–3
 Miami – Warfield 12 pass from Griese (Yepremian kick) – Steelers 21–10
 Miami – Warfield 86 pass from Griese (Yepremian kick) – Steelers 21–17
 Miami – Warfield 60 pass from Griese (Yepremian kick) – Dolphins 24–21

Week 10 (Sunday November 21, 1971): New York Giants  

at Three Rivers Stadium, Pittsburgh, Pennsylvania

 Game time: 
 Game weather: 
 Game attendance: 50,008
 Referee: Fred Silva
 TV announcers:

Scoring drives:

 New york giants – Houston 26 pass from Tarkenton (Gogolak kick) – Giants 7–0
 Pittsburgh – FG Gerela 25 – Giants 7–3
 New york giants – FG Gogolak 25 – Giants 10–3
 Pittsburgh – Rowser 70 interception return (Gerela kick) – Tie 10–10
 New york giants – FG Gogolak 29 – Giants 13–10
 Pittsburgh – Shanklin 4 pass from Bradshaw (Gerela kick) – Steelers 17–13

Week 11 (Sunday November 28, 1971): Denver Broncos  

at Three Rivers Stadium, Pittsburgh, Pennsylvania

 Game time: 
 Game weather: 
 Game attendance: 39,710
 Referee: Tommy Bell
 TV announcers:

Scoring drives:

 Denver – Little 3 run (J. Turner kick) – Broncos 7–0
 Denver – FG J. Turner 32 – Broncos 10–0
 Pittsburgh – Pearson 8 pass from Hanratty (Gerela kick) – Broncos 10–7
 Pittsburgh – FG Gerela 19 – Tie 10–10
 Denver – Little 16 run (Turner kick) – Broncos 17–10
 Denver – Safety, Lynch tackled Walden in end zone – Broncos 19–10
 Denver – FG J. Turner 12 – Broncos 22–10

Week 12 (Sunday December 5, 1971): Houston Oilers  

at the Houston Astrodome, Houston, Texas

 Game time: 
 Game weather: 
 Game attendance: 37,778
 Referee: Fred Swearingen
 TV announcers:

Scoring drives:

 Houston – Reed 27 pass from Pastorini (Moseley kick) – Oilers 7–0
 Houston – FG Moseley 25 – Oilers 10–0
 Houston – Campbell 8 run (kick blocked) – Oilers 16–0
 Houston – FG Moseley 37 – Oilers 19–0
 Houston – FG Moseley 25 – Oilers 22–0
 Pittsburgh – FG Gerela 15 – Oilers 22–3
 Houston – Holmes 4 run (Moselely kick) – Oilers 29–3

Week 13 (Sunday December 12, 1971): Cincinnati Bengals  

at Riverfront Stadium, Cincinnati

 Game time: 
 Game weather: 
 Game attendance: 60,022
 Referee: Jack Vest
 TV announcers:

Scoring drives:

 Pittsburgh – Hanratty 3 run (Gerela kick) – Steelers 7–0
 Cincinnati – Coslet 43 pass from Carter (Muhlmann kick) – Tie 7–7
 Cincinnati – FG Muhlmann 22 – Bengals 10–7
 Cincinnati – FG Muhlmann 18 – Bengals 13–7
 Pittsburgh – Fuqua 40 pass from Bradshaw (Gerela kick) – Steelers 14–13
 Pittsburgh – Shanklin 5 pass from Bradshaw (Gerela kick) – Steelers 21–13

Week 14 (Sunday December 19, 1971): Los Angeles Rams  

at Three Rivers Stadium, Pittsburgh, Pennsylvania

 Game time: 
 Game weather: 
 Game attendance: 45,233
 Referee:  Pat Haggerty
 TV announcers:

Scoring drives:

 Los Angeles – FG Ray 15 – Rams 3–0
 Los Angeles – FG Ray 15 – Rams 6–0
 Los Angeles – Snow 20 pass from Gabriel (Ray kick) – Rams 13–0
 Pittsburgh – L. Brown 3 pass from Bradshaw (Gerela kick) – Rams 13–7
 Los Angeles – FG Ray 15 – Rams 16–7
 Pittsburgh – Shanklin 2 pass from Bradshaw (Gerela kick) – Rams 16–14
 Los Angeles – L. Smith 1 run (Ray kick) – Rams 23–14

Standings

References

External links
 1971 Pittsburgh Steelers season at Profootballreference.com 
 1971 Pittsburgh Steelers season statistics at jt-sw.com 

Pittsburgh Steelers seasons
Pittsburgh Steelers
Pittsburgh Steel